Norihiro Komada (駒田 徳広, born September 14, 1962 in Shiki District, Nara, Japan) is a former Nippon Professional Baseball infielder.

External links

1962 births
Living people
Baseball people from Nara Prefecture
Japanese baseball players
Nippon Professional Baseball infielders
Yomiuri Giants players
Yokohama BayStars players
Japanese baseball coaches
Nippon Professional Baseball coaches